Vijapur is one of the 182 Legislative Assembly constituencies of Gujarat state in India. It is part of Mahesana district. It is numbered as 26-Vijapur.

List of segments
This assembly seat represents the following segments,
 Vijapur Taluka

Members of Vidhan Sabha
 1975 - A. K. Patel, Independent   
 1980 - A. K. Patel, Bharatiya Janata Party
 1985 - Nareshkumar Raval, Indian National Congress
 1990 - Nareshkumar Raval, Indian National Congress
 1995 - Atmaram Patel, Indian National Congress
 1998 - Nareshkumar Raval, Indian National Congress
 2002 - Kanti Patel, Bharatiya Janata Party
 2007 - Kanti Patel, Bharatiya Janata Party
 2012 - Prahladbhai Patel, Indian National Congress

Election results

2022

2017 Vidhan Sabha Election

2012 Vidhan Sabha Election

1975 Vidhan Sabha Election
 Patel, Amaratabhai Kalidas (IND) : 26,826 votes
 Patel Atmaram Maganlal (KLP) : 	17234

References

External links
 

Assembly constituencies of Gujarat
Mehsana district
Year of establishment missing